The National Olympic Committee of the Republic of Belarus was one of many national Olympic committees that make up the International Olympic Committee. On February 26, 2022, in response to the Russian invasion of Ukraine and its treatment of Belarusian athletes, the International Olympic Committee suspended the NOC RB. Created in 1991, the NOC RB, was charged with selecting athletes to represent Belarus in the Summer and Winter Olympic Games, enforcing anti-doping laws and promoting sporting activity inside Belarus. The current president of the NOC RB is Victor Lukashenko, the son of the current President of Belarus.

History 

The NOC RB was established on March 22, 1991, in response to the dissolution of the Soviet Union. Until that event, Belarus and the other fourteen Soviet Socialist Republics' Olympic activity were controlled by the Olympic Committee of the USSR, which did not disband until 1992. During that same year, Belarus competed in the 1992 Summer and Winter Olympics as part of the Unified Team. Granted temporary membership in 1992, the NOC RB was not granted full membership until the 101st International Olympic Committee Session in the year 1993. Also in 1993, Vladimir Ryzhenkov, who was at the time the Belarus Minister for Sport and Tourism, was elected to the post of President of the NOC RB. Ryzhenkov held the position until his death in 1996, but was replaced in 1997 with Alexander Lukashenko. In Lukashenko's first speech as NOC RB president, he stated there were no other examples of a head of state serving as a NOC Chairman or President at the same time. From 2005 to 2015 George Katulin served as a secretary general of NOC RB.

In December 2020, the International Olympic Committee sanctioned members of the NOC RB, including Alexander Lukashenko, Viktor Lukashenko and Dzmitry Baskau, for political discrimination against Belarusian athletes.
	
On August 9, 2021, the Belarus Olympic Committee was added to the Specially Designated Nationals and Blocked Persons List by the United States Department of the Treasury.

In addition, the presidents of the NOC Alexander and Viktor Lukashenko are under the sanctions of the United States, the European Union, the United Kingdom, Switzerland and Canada, while Dzmitry Baskau, a member of the executive board, is banned from entering Lithuania, Latvia and Estonia. 

On February 26, 2022, in response to the Russian invasion of Ukraine and its treatment of Belarusian athletes, the International Olympic Committee suspended the NOC RB.

Executive Board

Member federations

The Belarusian National Federations are the organizations that coordinate all aspects of their individual sports. They are responsible for training, competition and development of their sports. There are currently 36 Olympic Summer and 8 Winter Sport Federations in Belarus.

See also

Belarus at the Olympics

References

External links

Official website
NOC of Belarus (IOC)
About NOC of Belarus on official website
NOC of Belarus Executive Board

Belarus
 
Olympic
1991 establishments in Belarus
Belarusian entities subject to the U.S. Department of the Treasury sanctions